Dayton Airport may refer to these airports serving Dayton, Ohio, United States:

 Dayton International Airport (FAA/IATA: DAY), also known as James M. Cox Dayton International Airport
 Dayton-Wright Brothers Airport (FAA/IATA: MGY)
 Dahio Trotwood Airport (FAA: I44), also known as Dayton-New Lebanon Airport